From Here You'll Watch the World Go By is an album by the Legendary Pink Dots, released in 1995.

Critical reception

AllMusic wrote: "Generally speaking, the focus on the album is on group performances with odd interjections as opposed to full-on cut-up efforts, with Ka-Spel's now sui generis lyrical approach and delivery leading the weird and wild way as always."

Track listing

Personnel
 The Silverman - keyboards, soundtools
 Ryan Moore - acoustic bass, electric bass, drums and percussion
 Niels Van Hoornblower - saxophones, flute, bass clarinet
 Martijn De Kleer - electric guitar, acoustic guitar, drums
 Edward Ka-Spel - voice, keyboards
 Raymond Steeg - sound tools

References

 

1995 albums
The Legendary Pink Dots albums